The Men's Individual Pursuit B track cycling event at the 2012 Summer Paralympics took place on 30 August at London Velopark. This class was for blind and visually impaired cyclists riding with a sighted pilot. Eight pairs from six different nations competed.

The competition began with four head to head races between the eight riders. These races were held over a 4000m course and each rider was given a time for their race. The fastest two riders were advanced to the gold medal final whilst the third and fourth fastest times raced it out for the bronze.

Preliminaries
Q = Qualifier
PR = Paralympic Record
WR = World Record

Finals 
Gold medal match

Bronze medal match

References

Men's pursuit B